The Mysterious Rider may refer to:

 The Mysterious Rider (1921), a western novel by Zane Grey.
 The Mysterious Rider (1921 film), an American Western silent film directed by Benjamin B. Hampton that was based on the novel
 The Mysterious Rider (1927 film), an American Western silent film directed by John Waters that was based on the novel
 The Mysterious Rider (1933 film), an American Western film directed by Fred Allen
 The Mysterious Rider (1938 film), an American Western film directed by Lesley Selander that was based on the novel
 The Mysterious Rider (1942 film), an American Western film directed by Sam Newfield
 The Mysterious Rider (1948 film), English title for Il cavaliere misterioso, an Italian historical-adventure film directed by Riccardo Freda